Lakshmipuram (L.Pudhupatti) is a village in south Tamil Nadu, India. It is situated at the foothills of the Western Ghats,  from the city of Theni. The population of this village is over 10,000.

Lakshmipuram is surrounded by Kodaikanal Taluk to the north, Andipatti Taluk to the south, Theni Taluk to the south, and Batlagundu Taluk to the east. Lakshmipuram village is Located in Periyakulam Taluk, Theni district, Madurai Region, State Of Tamil Nadu in South India. It is 500 km from the state capital Chennai.

Lakshmipuram village panchayat has set a role model in greening the district and disposing of waste generated from the panchayat. The village won the  Nirmal Puraskar award on two occasions from The Government of India, The village is famous for cultivation of sugarcane mainly and various other seasoned crops like Cotton, Maize, Rice, Mango, Banana and Coconut. Several sugarcane auction markets are located near by the village.

The Theni district court is located on this village.

Famous Festivals 
Kaaliyamman Kovil Pongal festival is the famous religious festival observed by the locals in early or later school holidays depends on village organising committee decision. It is a week-long celebration starts with Karupasamy Kovil Pongal starts on Wednesday till Sunday in which most of the nearby village people also will take part.

Transport 
There is no railway station within 10 km of Lakshmipuram. However both Madurai and Dindigul Jn Railway stations are major railway stations around 70 km from Lakshmipuram.

References

Villages in Theni district